Sabita Chowdhury (29 June 2017) was an Indian singer.

Married to Salil Chowdhury, they had two daughters (Antara and Sanchari) and two sons (Sanjoy and Bobby) before his death. Sabita Chowdhury died of lung cancer in Kolkata on 29 June 2017, aged 72. Her body lay in repose at Rabindra Sadan.

Singing in Bengali and Hindi, Chowdhury also performed playback for films.  Some of her more famous songs are "Du chokhey aashaar nodi chhalachhal", "Jaare jaa jaa mono paakhi", and "Oi jhilmil jhauer boney".

References

1940s births
2017 deaths
20th-century Indian singers
20th-century Indian women singers
21st-century Indian singers
21st-century Indian women singers
Bengali playback singers
deaths from cancer in India
Indian women playback singers
singers from Kolkata
women musicians from West Bengal